Terje Nyberget  (born 8 July 1953) is a Norwegian military officer and politician.

He was born in Østre Toten to Egil Nyberget and Solveig Lundstad. He was elected representative to the Storting for the period 1989–1993 for the Progress Party.

References

1953 births
Living people
People from Østre Toten
Progress Party (Norway) politicians
Members of the Storting